József Rády (22 September 1884 – 11 October 1957) was a Hungarian fencer. He won a silver medal at the 1924 Summer Olympics and a gold medal at the 1928 Summer Olympics.

References

External links
 

1884 births
1957 deaths
Hungarian male sabre fencers
Olympic fencers of Hungary
Fencers at the 1924 Summer Olympics
Fencers at the 1928 Summer Olympics
Olympic gold medalists for Hungary
Olympic silver medalists for Hungary
Olympic medalists in fencing
People from Szekszárd
Medalists at the 1924 Summer Olympics
Medalists at the 1928 Summer Olympics
Sportspeople from Tolna County